Sue Mayfield was born in 1963 in England. She is a writer of fiction for children and young adults. Many of her works are about young people overcoming difficulties and the themes that are in her works are loss, friendship, and forgiveness. Previously a teacher, Mayfield has been regularly visiting several schools since 1990 to read her works and lead writing workshops  and has also taught creative writing to adults. She  facilitates others peoples' writing in healthcare settings and has worked in doctor's surgeries, hospitals, and museums.

Awards 
Mayfield won the Heartland Award for Excellence in Young Adult Literature, in 2005 for Drowning Anna. Her novel Blue was nominated for the Carnegie Medal and sold over 15,000 copies.

Bibliography

Young adult fiction 
 	Damage (2006)
 	Poisoned (2004)
 	Voices (2003)
 	Reckless (2002)
 	Blue (2001)
 	Patterns in the Sand (2004)
 	On Eagles' Wings (2004)

Children's fiction 
 	Shoot! (2003)
 	The Four Franks (2006)
 	Molly Muddle's Cake (2004)
 	Our Wonderful World! (2004)
 	Drowning Anna (2005)
 	Texto à la mer (2007)

Spirituality 
 	Life Attitudes
 	Life Balance
 	Youth Emmaus

References
 "Sue Mayfield". WorldCat.org. Retrieved 26 March 2010.
 "Biography: Sue Mayfield". Cheltenham Festivals, Arts Council England.
 "Sue Mayfield". Hachette Children's Group.
 "Sue Mayfield". Contemporary Authors Online, Gale, 2006. Literature Resource Center.

External links
 Sue Mayfield website

1963 births
Living people
21st-century English novelists
English children's writers
English spiritual writers
Alumni of the University of Oxford